Shakil Abu Sufian (born 1980) is a Bangladeshi chess player International Master and National Chess Coach.

Career
Md. Abu Sufian earned the FIDE Master title in 2001 and International Master title in 2011. Both of his title he got from Asian Zonal Chess Championship from Colombo, Sri Lanka. He represented Bangladesh in several chess competitions from 2005 to 2015.
he is also doing  a job as a National Chess Coach of National Sports Council of Bangladesh since 2006. he was elected as General Secretary of Association of Chess players, Bangladesh at 2014 and currently he is the President of this (ACPB) organisation. He participated three times in Chess Olympiad (Turin, Italy in 2006; Dresden, Germany in 2008 and Khanty-Manshisk, Russia in 2010) on behalf of the Bangladesh Chess team.

References

External links
 
 

1980 births
Living people
Bangladeshi chess players
Chess Olympiad competitors
Chess players at the 2010 Asian Games
Asian Games competitors for Bangladesh
Chess International Masters